Davide Di Francesco (born 19 January 2001) is an Italian professional footballer who plays as a winger for  club Monterosi.

Club career
On 21 July 2022, Di Francesco signed with Monterosi.

Career statistics

References

External links 
 
 
 

2001 births
Living people
Sportspeople from the Province of Teramo
Italian footballers
Association football midfielders
Serie C players
Ascoli Calcio 1898 F.C. players
Juventus F.C. players
Alma Juventus Fano 1906 players
S.S. Teramo Calcio players
S.S.D. Città di Campobasso players
Monterosi Tuscia F.C. players
Footballers from Abruzzo